Edward J. Trumbull  (born as Edward J. Trembly) (November 3, 1860 – January 14, 1937) was a Major League Baseball outfielder and pitcher. He played for the 1884 Washington Nationals.

Sources

Major League Baseball outfielders
Major League Baseball pitchers
Washington Nationals (AA) players
Baseball players from Massachusetts
19th-century baseball players
1860 births
1937 deaths
People from Chicopee, Massachusetts
Holyoke (minor league baseball) players
Springfield (minor league baseball) players